"Too Many Fish in the Sea" is a 1964 hit song recorded by Motown singing group The Marvelettes. It was the group's first top 40 pop hit in almost a year, reaching #25 on the Billboard Hot 100, and was one of the first hit singles written by Norman Whitfield; Eddie Holland also had a hand in the writing. "Too Many Fish..." was also Whitfield's first produced single.

Background
This record is the only one where group members Georgeanna Tillman and Katherine Anderson had a lead on the A-side. This is also the final A-side appearance for Tillman, who would leave the group, due to her illnesses, in very early 1965, before they recorded their next single, "I'll Keep Holding On". This would also be the last single in which Gladys Horton would lead on the A-side, as Wanda Young Rogers (who also led on this and the two previous singles) would be the group's sole lead on A-sides, relegating Horton to B-side leads. Norman Whitfield would later use similar vocal techniques with The Temptations on hit songs such as "I Can't Get Next To You" and "Cloud Nine".

Credits
Lead and background vocals by Gladys Horton (verses and choruses), Wanda Young (choruses), Georgeanna Tillman (choruses) and Katherine Anderson (choruses)
Instrumentation by The Funk Brothers

Chart performance

Later versions and usage
Mitch Ryder and the Detroit Wheels also charted "Too Many Fish" as a medley with "Three Little Fishes". It reached #24 in 1967.
Although The Marvelettes version of "Too Many Fish in the Sea" does not appear in the 1983 film The Big Chill it is included on both the Original Motion Picture Soundtrack and More Songs from the Big Chill.

References

1964 singles
The Marvelettes songs
Mitch Ryder songs
Soul songs
Motown singles
Songs written by Norman Whitfield
Songs written by Eddie Holland
Song recordings produced by Norman Whitfield
1964 songs